Elachista coalita is a moth of the family Elachistidae first described by Lauri Kaila in 2011. It is found in south-eastern Australia, including the Australian Capital Territory, New South Wales and Tasmania.

The wingspan is 6.2-8.1 mm for males and 7-7.2 mm for females. The forewings are pale grey for males and black with a bronzy sheen and four white markings for females. The hindwings are grey.

The larvae feed on Joycea pallida. They mine the leaves of their host plant. The mine is straight and gradually widens. It reaches a length of about 200 mm. The frass is deposited in a dense block in the rear of the mine. Pupation takes place outside of the mine on either a leaf or a twig of the host plant.

References

Moths described in 2011
coalita
Moths of Australia